H-IIB (H2B) was an expendable space launch system jointly developed by the Japanese government's space agency JAXA and Mitsubishi Heavy Industries. It was used to launch the H-II Transfer Vehicle (HTV, or Kōnotori) cargo spacecraft for the International Space Station. The H-IIB was a liquid-fueled rocket, with solid-fuel strap-on boosters and was launched from the Tanegashima Space Center in southern Japan. H-IIB made its first flight in 2009, and had made a total of nine flights through 2020 with no failures.

Its performance to low Earth orbit (LEO) was sufficient for the  H-II Transfer Vehicle (HTV). The first H-IIB was launched in September 2009 and the last H-IIB was launched in May 2020.

Development 

The H-IIB was a space launch vehicle jointly designed, manufactured and operated by JAXA and Mitsubishi Heavy Industries to launch the H-II Transfer Vehicle. The system was designed to adopt methods and components that have already been verified by flights on the H-IIA, so that manufacturing the new launch vehicle would be more cost-effective, with less risk, in a shorter period of time. JAXA was in charge of preliminary design, readiness of the ground facility, and the development of new technologies for the H-IIB, in which the private sector has limited competencies, while the Mitsubishi Heavy Industries was responsible for manufacturing. JAXA successfully conducted eight firing tests of the new cluster design with the simulated first-stage propulsion system, called Battleship Firing Tests, since March 2008, at MHI's Tashiro Test Facility in Ōdate, Akita Prefecture.

Before launch, two Captive Firing Tests were conducted on the H-IIB. The first test, which consisted of firing the first stage for ten seconds, was originally scheduled to occur at 02:30 UTC on 27 March 2009, however it was cancelled after the launch pad's coolant system failed to activate. This was later discovered to have been due to a manual supply valve not being open. The test was rescheduled for 1 April 2009, but then postponed again due to a leak in a pipe associated with the launch facility's fire suppression system. The test was rescheduled for 2 April 2009, when it was successfully conducted at 05:00 UTC. Following this, the second test, which involved a 150-second burn of the first stage, was scheduled for 20 April. This was successfully conducted at 04:00 UTC on 22 April 2009, following a two-day delay due to unfavorable weather conditions. A ground test, using a battleship mockup of the rocket was subsequently conducted on 11 July 2009.

By 2009, the development program of the H-IIB had cost approximately 27 billion yen.

Vehicle description 
The H-IIB launch vehicle was a two-stage rocket. The first stage used liquid oxygen and liquid hydrogen as propellants and had four strap-on solid rocket boosters (SRB-A3) powered by polybutadiene. The first stage was powered by two LE-7A engines, instead of one for the H-IIA. It had four SRB-As attached to the body, while the standard version of H-IIA had two SRB-As. In addition, the first-stage body of the H-IIB was 5.2 m in diameter compared with 4 m for the H-IIA. The total length of the first stage was extended by 1 m from that of H-IIA. As a result, the H-IIB first stage held 70% more propellant than that of the H-IIA. The second stage was powered by a single LE-5B engine, which was also propelled by a hydrogen/oxygen fuel and oxidizer.

Launch history 

The first launch of the H-IIB occurred on 10 September 2009 at 17:01:46 UTC. It successfully launched the HTV-1, which was on a mission to resupply the International Space Station (ISS).

See also 

 Comparison of orbital launchers families
 Comparison of orbital launch systems

References

External links 
 JAXA | H-IIB Launch Vehicle 
 "Development Status of the H-IIB Launch Vehicle". Mitsubishi Heavy Industries Technical Review Volume 45 Number 4
 H-2B rocket 3D model

Mitsubishi Heavy Industries space launch vehicles
Vehicles introduced in 2009
Expendable space launch systems